David Paterson Watt (1885 – 25 April 1917) was a Scottish professional golfer. He won the Scottish Professional Championship in 1914. He was one of the few left-handed golfers of the period. Watt was in the Cameron Highlanders during World War I but died following a leg amputation.

Early life
Watt was born in 1885 in Dunbar, East Lothian, Scotland. He had four golfing brothers: Jim, John, Robert and Willie.

Golf career
While at Dirleton, Watt was runner-up to Willie Binnie in the 1909 Dunlop Cup, taking the second prize of £5.

In 1910 Watt became the professional at Mortonhall Golf Club, just south of Edinburgh.

Watt was runner-up in the 1912 Scottish Professional Championship. at Dunbar, 5 strokes behind his brother Willie. He took the second prize of £15. He went one better in the 1914 Championship at Glen Golf Club, beating Willie by 2 strokes and winning the first prize of £20. Willie led by 5 shots after the third round but took 78 in the final round to Davie's excellent 71. Willie came to the last hole needing 4 to tie but got into two bunkers and took 6. Watt played in the 1914 Open Championship at Prestwick Golf Club and finished tied for 25th place, again two shots better than Willie.

Death
Watt died on 25 April 1917 in a Kent Hospital. He was in the Cameron Highlanders and died following a leg amputation. He was buried in Newington Cemetery in Edinburgh. His name is on the Dirleton War Memorial.

Tournament wins
1914 Scottish Professional Championship

Results in major championships

Note: Watt only played in The Open Championship.

"T" indicates a tie for a place

References

Scottish male golfers
Left-handed golfers
Queen's Own Cameron Highlanders soldiers
British Army personnel of World War I
British military personnel killed in World War I
People from Dunbar
1885 births
1917 deaths